The 1985 All-Ireland Under-21 Hurling Championship was the 22nd staging of the All-Ireland Under-21 Hurling Championship since its establishment by the Gaelic Athletic Association in 1964.

Kilkenny entered the championship as the defending champions.

On 25 August 1985, Tipperary won the championship following a 1-10 to 2-06 defeat of Kilkenny in the All-Ireland final. This was their sixth All-Ireland title in the under-21 grade and their first in four championship seasons.

Results

Leinster Under-21 Hurling Championship

Quarter-finals

Semi-finals

Final

Munster Under-21 Hurling Championship

First round

Semi-finals

Final

All-Ireland Under-21 Hurling Championship

Semi-finals

Final

References

Under
All-Ireland Under-21 Hurling Championship